Piotr Trytek is a Polish general who was appointed by the European Union on 28 October 2022 to lead its mission for training Ukrainian troops during the 2022 Russian invasion of Ukraine, EUMAM Ukraine.

 Trytek is commander of the Polish Armed Force’s 11th Lubuska Armored Cavalry Division, and served as part of the missions in Iraq and Afghanistan.

References 

1971 births
Living people
Polish generals
Polish Army officers
People from Stargard